Willis E. Benedict (July 16, 1858 – August 17, 1917) was a member of the South Dakota Senate and the South Dakota House of Representatives.

He was born in Lafayette County, Wisconsin. He moved to Lincoln County, South Dakota in 1872. On August 12, 1899, Benedict married Maude Ionia Druse. They had one daughter. Benedict is buried in Canton, South Dakota.

Career
Benedict was a member of the Senate from 1899 to 1900 and of the House of Representatives from 1901 to 1902. He was a Republican.

References

People from Lafayette County, Wisconsin
People from Lincoln County, South Dakota
Republican Party South Dakota state senators
Republican Party members of the South Dakota House of Representatives
1858 births
1917 deaths
19th-century American politicians